Fátima Gomes Bernardes (born 17 September 1962) is a Brazilian journalist and TV host. She joined Rede Globo in 1987 as the host of RJTV, the regional news from Rio de Janeiro, and became widely known in 1989 when she hosted Jornal da Globo, the late night news program. She also hosted Fantástico, Jornal Hoje, and Jornal Nacional, where she was the news anchor from 1998 to 2011.

Since 2012, Bernardes currently hosts the morning talk show Encontro.

Biography 
Bernardes studied journalism at the Federal University of Rio de Janeiro. She began working for the Brazilian newspaper O Globo in 1983. In February 1987, she joined Rede Globo as a news presenter, and in a few months she was hosting RJTV, Globo's regional news program for the state of Rio de Janeiro. In May 1989, she hosted late night news program Jornal da Globo alongside Eliakim Araújo, and from July 1989, with William Bonner, who she eventually married the following year.

Filmography

References

External links 
 Official website
 

1962 births
Living people
People from Rio de Janeiro (city)
Brazilian journalists
Brazilian women journalists
Brazilian television presenters
Brazilian women television presenters
Federal University of Rio de Janeiro alumni